Schecter Guitar Research, commonly known simply as Schecter, is an American manufacturing company founded in 1976 by David Schecter, which originally produced only replacement parts for existing guitars from manufacturers such as Fender and Gibson.

Today, the company mass-produces its own line of electric and acoustic guitars, basses, amplifiers and effects units through its own brand and four subsidiary companies.

History

Custom shop days, 1976–1983
In 1976, David Schecter opened Schecter Guitar Research, a repair shop in Van Nuys, California. The shop manufactured replacement guitar necks and bodies, complete pickup assemblies, bridges, pickguards, tuners, knobs, potentiometers, and other miscellaneous guitar parts. Contrary to popular belief, Schecter never supplied parts to Fender nor Gibson. By the late 1970s Schecter offered more than 400 guitar parts, but did not offer any finished instruments.

In 1979, Schecter offered, for the first time, its own fully assembled electric guitars. These guitars were custom shop models based on Fender designs. They were considered of very high quality and expensive, and were sold only by twenty retailers across the United States.

Schecter guitars and parts have been used by, among others, Prince, Rick Parfitt, Robert Smith, Simon Gallup, Porl Thompson, Yngwie Malmsteen, Michael Anthony, John Norum, Gary Holt, Steve Lukather, Pete Townshend, Jeff Loomis, Mark Knopfler, Gustavo Cerati,  Ritchie Blackmore, Chris Poland, East Bay Ray, Synyster Gates, Zacky Vengeance, Richard Patrick, Jinxx, Jake Pitts, Tommy Victor, Dan Donegan, Lou Reed, Todd Rundgren, Robin Zander, Rodrigo Amarante, Tony Maue, Shaun Morgan, and Nikki Sixx.

Texan ownership and mass production, 1983–1987

By 1983, Schecter had reached its custom shop production limit and could no longer meet demand. That year, the company was purchased by a group of Texas investors who wanted to build upon Schecter's reputation for quality. The investors moved the company to Dallas, Texas, where they produced above-par quality guitars using both imported parts and Schecter parts under the Schecter name for less than five years.

At the 1984 winter NAMM show, Schecter introduced twelve new guitars and basses, all based on Fender designs. The most popular of these guitars was a Telecaster-style guitar similar to those that Pete Townshend played. Although Townshend never endorsed this model, it was known unofficially as the "Pete Townshend model". Eventually, the Telecaster-style guitar became known as the "Saturn", and the company's Stratocaster-style guitar became known as the "Mercury".

All guitars have the "lawsuit" peg heads (two small marks on back of headstocks). Schecter was still using Stratocaster and Telecaster headstocks, which Fender had allowed when they were a parts company. It appears this lawsuit may have essentially led to their closing in late 1986 to early 1987. The current owners purchased the name in late 1987.

During this period, Schecter managed to sign famous endorsee, Swedish guitarist Yngwie Malmsteen. Schecter built several custom guitars for Yngwie Malmsteen that featured scalloped necks and reverse headstocks.

Hisatake Shibuya and reform, 1987 – present

In 1987, the Texas investors sold the company to Hisatake Shibuya, a Japanese entrepreneur who also owned the Musicians Institute in Hollywood and ESP Guitars (To this day, Schecter Guitar Research and ESP Guitars have remained separate entities). Shibuya moved the company back to California and returned Schecter to its custom shop roots, devoting all its efforts to manufacturing high-end, expensive custom instruments.

Schecter guitars were once again only available from a few retailers, one of them being Sunset Custom Guitars in Hollywood, which Hisatake Shibuya also owned. Sunset Custom Guitars happened to be the place where Michael Ciravolo, the future president of Schecter Guitar Research, worked. During 1994/1995 Schecter managed to sign other famous endorsee, Swedish guitarist John Norum.

In 1995, Schecter introduced the highly sought-after 'S Series' guitars and basses, which were Fender-style instruments. In 1996, Hisatake Shibuya asked Michael Ciravolo to become Schecter's president and run the company. Michael Ciravolo, an experienced musician, brought to the company many well-known musicians as endorsees. These included Robert DeLeo of Stone Temple Pilots, Jay Noel Yuenger ( whose Teisco Spectrum 5 served as a model for J's stage guitars) and Sean Yseult of White Zombie, and Xavier Rhone of the band Carbon Nation.

Michael Ciravolo never really liked Fender designs, so he sought to distance the company from its past Fender-style models. Toward that end, he added the Avenger, Hellcat, "Hollywood Classic CT" and Tempest models to the Schecter catalog. He also wanted to reach a new generation of musicians he felt were ignored by most major guitar manufacturers. Yet, at this point, the company was only producing expensive, custom shop models with a return to exceptional quality not seen since the early custom shop days under Dave Schecter. (Schecter's maximum output was forty guitars a month -all custom made.) To realize his vision, Ciravolo began searching for a factory that could mass-produce Schecter guitars while maintaining high quality standards while maintaining production in the USA Custom shop. As a result of the low production and focus on quality, the USA custom models from this era (1996-2000) are some of the most sought after among guitar collectors.

Michael Ciravolo met with several Asian guitar manufacturers at the Tokyo Music Festival and subsequently decided on a factory in Incheon, South Korea. (Though not known for sure, this location could be the electric guitar factory of World Musical Instrument co. Ltd.) Schecter's guitars were built in the South Korea factory and shipped to the U.S., where they were set up in a Schecter shop. At the 1998 summer NAMM show, with the addition of now Executive Vice President Marc LaCorte, Schecter introduced the Diamond Series, which included six affordably priced non-custom guitars. The line included an affordable seven-string guitar, the A-7, to the market when none were previously available

In 2000, Schecter introduced the now legendary C-1, which was debuted by Jerry Horton in Papa Roach's "Last Resort" music video. The Diamond Series is still in production to this day.

Expanded custom shop, return of USA production, and Schecter Amplification, 2013–present

In 2012, it was announced that Schecter expanded their custom shop, adding 14,000 square feet to the facility. Later the same year, Schecter announced a new line of USA-built guitars that would bring the company back to its "roots". This included the acquisition of several CNC machines from Haas Automation and a new 1,500 square feet spray booth. The new line would be called the "USA Production Series." These guitars were officially debuted at the 2013 Winter NAMM show. Schecter also announced a new line of hand-wound electric guitar and bass pickups, that would be available on USA Production and custom shop models, and possibly will be available for purchase in 2013.

Along with the announcement of the USA Production Series, Schecter announced their introduction into the amplification market. These new amps were designed in part with well-known amplifier designer James Brown, known for designing the Peavey 5150 amplifier with Eddie Van Halen, and his line of effect pedals under the Amptweaker name. The amps first announced were the Hellraiser USA 100, Hellraiser Stage 100, Hellwin USA 100, and Hellwin Stage 100. The USA versions are built in Schecter's USA custom shop, while the Stage series is built overseas. The Hellwin is the signature amp for Avenged Sevenfold guitarist Synyster Gates, who helped design the head with James Brown. Both amps use EL34 power tubes, an on-board noise gate, a passive and active input that compensate for the output difference by changing the circuit instead of reducing output, and a "Focus" control that adjusts the low end response. The main difference between the Hellwin and the Hellraiser is the Hellwin's use of MIDI to control the amp. The Hellwin is also a three-channel amp, as opposed to the Hellraiser's two-channel design. Schecter also introduced a line of speaker cabinets, one featuring a 200W sub-woofer called the "Depth Charge", that would increase the cabinet's bass response. These amps were debuted, along with the USA Production Line, at Winter NAMM 2013.

Diamond Series
The Diamond Series was first introduced in 1998, and consists of all the non-custom, mass-produced Schecter models. The Diamond Series is further divided into groups of guitars, which share common design characteristics. Schecter has stated that it will not customize any Diamond Series guitar, thus any Diamond Series guitar is sold "as is".

Although there are a large variety of models available in the Diamond range, many are 'mixed and matched' parts from different Schecter guitars. For example, all "Omen", "C", "Hellraiser" and "Damien" basses have the same body shape, although some have set necks rather than bolt on necks, different finish colors, and different woods. However, Schecter produces many different guitars from a smaller number of core parts. This mix and match culture has the benefit of allowing guitarists to find a Schecter to fit their exact requirements, but negatively gives less of a 'core product' range as shown by Gibson Guitars who only have a small range of guitars available.

Some of the best known guitars made by Schecter are the 'C Series' in various configurations such as the "Hellraiser" and "Blackjack" models, and the S Series, which included the S-1 Elite (double cut) guitars, which resembled Gibson's Les Paul Double Cut and double cut Melody Maker—and the S-1 (a less fancy version of the S-1 Elite). The 'Elite' versions of Schecter's mass-produced instruments often include an arched top, abalone binding, a bound fretboard and a bound headstock with a finish matched to the body. Despite the decorative features, these instruments remained affordable and of reasonable quality. Pickups on many mass-produced Schecter models are almost always 'Duncan Designed' humbuckers (double coil pickups based on Seymour Duncan's pickup specifications), usually with a 'push-pull' coil splitter control that splits the full humbucker pickup sound into the sharper tone of a single coil pickup.

Schecter targeted specific market segments with occasional limited runs of its mass-produced guitar models in novelty finishes. The 'Aviation Series', which appeared around 2006 and ran for about a year, equipped certain mass-produced model bodies (the PT, Tempest, S-1, etc.) with World War II US (and British) aircraft colors and markings, and special pickup covers that look like cooling louvers.

Schecter also makes seven-string models, eight-string models and recently, nine-string models. Schecter's 'Diamond series' guitars use components such as TonePros locking bridge products on non-tremolo models and original Floyd Rose double locking tremolos on many of the six and seven string models. Many models also feature USA EMG or Seymour Duncan pick-ups and Grover tuners.

Products

Guitars
The following list of guitars are correct as appears on the Schecter Website

 C Series = C-1, C-1 Arist, C-1 Blackjack, C-1 Silver Mountain, C-1 Silver Mountain FR-S, C-1 Classic, C-1 Blackjack EX Baritone, C-1 Elite, C-1 Exotic Star, C-1 FR, Schecter C-1 Hellraiser FR, C-1 Lady Luck, C-1 Platinum, C-1 Plus, C-1 SheDevil, C-1 SheDevil FR, C-7, C-7 Blackjack, C-7 FR, C-1 XXX, C-8 Hellraiser, C-1 custom
 S Series = S-1, S-1 Blackjack
 Tempest Series = Hellraiser Tempest, Tempest Blackjack, Tempest Classic, Tempest Custom, Tempest Extreme (Excluding USA). Tempest-7
 00 Series = 006 Deluxe, 006 Extreme (Excludes USA), Hellraiser 006, 007, 007 Elite
 S-1 Tribal = Devil Tribal Delux, S-1 Scorpion Tribal Deluxe (Excludes USA)
 Devil Series =Devil Custom, Devil Spine
 Hollywood Series = Hollywood Classic
 Stargazer Series = Stargazer, Stargazer 12
 Sunset Series = Hellraiser Sunset FR, Sunset Deluxe
 Stiletto Series = Stiletto 6 FR, Stiletto Classic
 PT Series = PT, PT Fastback, Pete Dee Signature
 Hellcat Series = Hellcat VI
 Ultra Series = Ultra III, Ultra Classic, Ultracure (Robert Smith signature model), Ultra VI Bass/Baritone
 Artist Models = Loomis 7 and 7 FR (Jeff Loomis), Porl Thompson Model (Porl Thompson), RS-1000 and Ultracure (Robert Smith), Simon Gallup Ultra Spitfire (Simon Gallup), Synyster Standard, Custom, Deluxe and Special (Synyster Gates), Vengeance Custom and ZV Blade (Zacky Vengeance), Pete Dee Model (Pete Dee), Jake Pitts C-1 FR (Jake Pitts), Jinxx Recluse-FR (Jinxx), Al Jourgensen Signature Triton (Al Jourgensen) Machine Gun Kelly PT, Jack Fowler Traditional, Nick Johnston Traditional, Keith Merrow KM6 and KM7, Michael Anthony Model T, Nikki Sixx Sixx bass and J4 Sixx, dUg Pinnick DP4 and DP12, DJ Ashba Signature, Jerry Horton Tempest, Kenny Hickery C1 Sustainiac, Chris Howorth V-7, Randy Weitzel V-7, Robin Zander Corsair, Dale Stewart Avenger 4, and Johnny Christ Signature.
 Extreme Series = 006 Extreme (Excludes USA), Omen-6 Extreme (Excludes USA), Omen-6 FR, Omen-6 FR Extreme, Omen-7 Extreme, Tempest Extreme
Banshee Series = Banshee Extreme, Banshee Elite
 Demon = Demon, Demon-FR, Demon-7, Demon-7 FR 
 Hellraiser Series = Hellraiser 006, Hellraiser Avenger, Hellraiser C-1, Hellraiser C-1 FR, Hellraiser C-7, Hellraiser C-7 FR, Sunset Hellraiser FR, Hellraiser Tempest, Hellraiser V-1, Hellraiser V-1 FR, Hellraiser C-8 LIMITED EDITION, Hellraiser DLX
 Blackjack Series = C-1 Blackjack, S-1 Blackjack, C-1 Blackjack ATX, C-1 Blackjack ATX FR, C-1 Blackjack FR, C-1 Blackjack EX Baritone, C-7 Blackjack, C-7 Blackjack ATX, Tempest Blackjack, V-1 Blackjack ATX, V-1 Blackjack ATX FR, V-1 Blackjack, Blackjack ATX C-8
 Avenger = Avenger, Avenger FR LIMITED EDITION
 Omen Series = Omen Solo-6, Omen-6, Omen-6 Extreme, Omen-6 FR (Excludes USA), Omen-6 FR Extreme (Excludes USA), Omen-7, Omen-7 Extreme (Excludes USA), Omen-8
 Damien Series = Damien-6, Damien-6 FR, Damien-6 LH, Damien-6 FR LH, Damien Platinum-6, Damien Platinum-6 FR, Damien Platinum-6 FR S, Damien Platinum-6 LH, Damien Platinum-6 FR LH, Damien Platinum-6 FR S LH, Damien-7, Damien-7 LH, Damien Platinum-7, Damien Platinum-7 LH, Damien Platinum-8, Damien Platinum-8 LH, Damien Platinum-9
 V Series = V-1 Classic, Hellraiser V-1, Hellraiser V-1 FR, Blackjack ATX V-1, Blackjack ATX V-1 FR, Blackjack V-1, Damien V-1, Damien V-1 FR, Hellraiser V-7, Hellraiser V-7 FR, Hellraiser V-8
 Solo Series = Solo-6 Classic, Hellraiser Solo-6, Hellraiser Solo-6 FR LIMITED EDITION (2009)
 Semi/Hollow Body = Corsair, Corsair Bigsby, TSH-1, TSH-1 Classic
 7 Strings = C-7 Blackjack, Damien-7, Hellraiser C-7, Loomis-7, Loomis-7 FR, Omen-7, Omen-7 Extreme, 007, 007 Elite, C-7 Diamond Deluxe, Tempest-7
 Baritones = C-1 Blackjack EX Baritone
 Sun Valley Super Shredder Series = FR, FR S, PT FR
 Sun Valley Super Shredder III = 6, 7 String
 Apocalypse Series = C-1 Red Reign, C-1 Red Reign FR S, C-7 Red Reign, C-7 FR S Red Reign, Solo-II Red Reign, Solo-II FR Red Reign, V-1 Red Reign, V-1 FR Red Reign, C-1, C-1 EX, C-1 FR, C-1 FR S, C-7, E-1, PT, V-1
SGR Series (Import line) = 006 FR SGR, Avenger SGR, Banshee-6 FR SGR, Banshee-6 SGR, C-1 FR SGR, C-1 SGR, C7 SGR, S1 SGR

Acoustics
The following list of acoustics are correct as appears on the Schecter Website (Accessed 25 February 2012):

 Royal Acoustic
 Orleans Acoustic
 RS-1000 (Robert Smith signature model)
 GLP-1 (Grant Lee Phillips signature model)
 Hellraiser Studio Acoustic
 Hellraiser Stage Acoustic
 Omen Extreme Acoustic

Basses
The following list of basses are correct as appears on the Schecter Website (Accessed 18 December 2008):

 00 Series - 004 Series
 C Series - C-4, C-5
 Damien Series - Damien-4, Damien-5
 Diamond J - Diamond J-4, Diamond J-5
 Elite series - Elite-4, Elite-5
 Extreme Basses - Stiletto Extreme-4, Stiletto Extreme-5
 Hellraiser Series - Hellraiser-4, Hellraiser-5
 Model-T - Model-T
 Omen Series - Omen-4, Omen-5, Omen-8
 Riot series - Riot-4, Riot-5, Riot-6
 Stargazer Series - Stargazer-4, Stargazer-5
 Stiletto Series - Custom-4, Custom-5, Custom-6, Deluxe-4, Deluxe-5, Elite-4, Elite-5, Stealth-4, Stealth-5, Stiletto Extreme-4, Stiletto Extreme-5, Stiletto Stage-4, Stiletto Stage-5, Studio-4, Studio-5, Studio-6, Studio-8

Amplifiers
 Hellraiser
 Hellwin

Discontinued instruments 
The following instruments are no longer in production by Schecter Guitars as of 2012. Although, some guitars, like the Damien-7, The Banshee Elite, and Hellcat VI have been brought back for 2016 and are currently available to purchase on Schecter's official website.

Guitars
 Banshee
 00 Series = 006 Elite (2008), 007 Elite (2000-2007)
 C Series = C-1 Classic, C-1 Tremolo (2006 Only), C-1 Jolly Roger (2005 Only), C-1 30th Anniversary Model (2006 only), C-1 Exotic (2005–2006 only), C-1 Custom XXX (2005 only), C-1 Shedevil, C-1 Shedevil FR (only 100 made, 2009) C-1 E/A (2008), C-1 Elite (2008), C-1 Special (2007), C-1 Stealth, CB-2000 Celloblaster, C-7 Plus (discontinued), C/SH-1 (2007), C/SH-12 (2007 only), C-1 +
 S Series = S-1 DLX, S-1 PLUS (2001–2002), S-1 30th Anniversary Model (2006 only), S-1 Elite (2008), S-1 Hot Rod, S-1 Scorpion Tribal Doubleneck, S-1 "Bada Bling", S-1 "Black Widow" (2005 only), S-1 "The Devil's Rejects" (2007 only), S-1 "Vampira" (2003 only), S-1 Blackjack (2004).
 Hellraiser Series = Avenger Hellraiser FR (available exclusively at Drum City – GuitarLand, Inc. And 30 White models were made for special order through any authorized Schecter retailer in 2010)
 Avenger Series = Avenger "The Texas Chainsaw Massacre: The Beginning" (made only in 2007)
 Banshee Series = Banshee (2007)
 Gryphon Series = Gryphon Limited Edition (2008), Gryphon-7
 Hellcat Series = Hellcat (2008)
 Hot Rod Series = Hot Rod '39
 Artist Series = Jerry Horton C-1, Jerry Horton Tempest (2007 Only), PT 30th Anniversary Model (2006 only), PT Custom, Synyster Custom (White w/ Gold Stripes, only 100 made), Vengeance Special (2008), Vengeance Standard (Zacky Vengeance signature model, 2007 only), Pete Dee Diamond Series (White on Black, Black on White)
 PT Series = PT Elite, PT Blackjack
 Aviation Collection = PT "Flying Tiger" (2004 only), PT "Bomber Girl" (2004 only), S-1 "RAF Spitfire" (2006 only), Tempest "Midway" (2006 only), PT "Bottoms Up!" (2006 only), Ultra "P-51" (2006 only), Tempest "A-10 Warthog" (2007 only), Ultra "F-117 Stealth" (2007 only)
 Tempest Series = Tempest 30th Anniversary Model (2006 only), Tempest Deluxe, Tempest Special (only made in 2003), Tempest "New Orleans Saints NFL Katrina Relief" (only made in 2005), Traditional 30th Anniversary (2006 only)
 TSH-1
 Unknown Series = V-7, A-5X Celloblaster, A-7, SW-3500 (2007), T-1M33

Hollowbody
 Jazz Series
 Jazz Elite (last made in 2005)
 Jazz-6 (last made in 2002)
 Jazz-7 (last made in 2001)

Acoustics
 SW-Classical
 SW-1000
 SW-2000
 SW-2500
 SW-3000/RW
 SW-3000/QM
 Acoustic Elite (2008)
 Diamond ACS Acoustic (2008)

Basses

 Gryphon (Limited US "Guitar Center" run)
 Ultrabass, C-4XXX (2005 only)
 004 Series

Custom shop
As well as the mass-produced Diamond Series, Schecter offers a custom guitar service. On their website, Schecter says, "The Custom Shop is reserved only for orders made through a Schecter Authorized Dealer".

Example projects include:
 House of 1000 Corpses
 Tempest Tartan
 Dawn of the Dead Tribute
 CS-1 #26
 PT Nashville
 CET Flame Koa
 Hollywood Classic

References

External links

 Official website
 

Guitar manufacturing companies of the United States
Manufacturing companies based in California
Manufacturing companies established in 1976
1976 establishments in California